The women's 60 metres hurdles event at the 1985 IAAF World Indoor Games was held at the Palais Omnisports Paris-Bercy on 18 January.

Medalists

Results

Heats
First 3 of each heat (Q) and next 3 fastest (q) qualified for the semifinals.

Semifinals
First 3 of each semifinal (Q) qualified directly for the final.

Final

References

60
60 metres hurdles at the World Athletics Indoor Championships